× Brassidium, abbreviated in trade journals Brsdm, is an intergeneric hybrid between the orchid genera Brassia and Oncidium (Brs x Onc).

Orchid nothogenera
Oncidiinae